Roger Ola Nordström (born 27 April 1966 in Malmö, Sweden) is a Swedish former ice hockey goaltender. Playing most seasons for Malmö Redhawks, he then played for German Krefeld Pinguine between 1998-2003.

During the 1992 Olympic tournament he was appointed for the Swedish national team.

Trophies and awards

Club teams

National teams
 1994: World championship bronze medal in Italy with Sweden
 1995: World championship silver medal in Sweden with Sweden

References

External links
 

1966 births
Living people
Ice hockey players at the 1992 Winter Olympics
Olympic ice hockey players of Sweden
Sportspeople from Malmö
Swedish ice hockey goaltenders